Suyundyukovo (Höyöndök) is a rural locality (a village) in Kurtlykulsky Selsoviet, Karaidelsky District, Bashkortostan, Russia. The population was 158 as of 2010. There are 8 streets.

Geography 
Suyundyukovo is located 41 km southwest of Karaidel (the district's administrative centre) by road. Turnovo is the nearest rural locality.

References 

Rural localities in Karaidelsky District